Noradrenergic cell group A6 is a group of cells fluorescent for noradrenaline that are identical with the locus ceruleus, as identified by Nissl stain.

References

External links 
 BrainInfo

Norepinephrine